Downtown Bernalillo is a station on the New Mexico Rail Runner Express commuter rail line, located in Bernalillo, New Mexico, United States.

It is located in the center of the town of Bernalillo, on Railroad Track Road at East Calle Don Francisco and Calle Duranes near Camino del Pueblo. The station began service on April 27, 2007 as the seventh station on the line.

The station has free parking, with 23 spaces. The parking lot is the smallest of any Rail Runner station, because the station is so centrally located that many Bernalillo residents can walk to the station from their homes. The Station previously received bus service from Sandoval Easy Express, but has since been discontinued, and Sandoval Easy Express has been folded into the Rio Metro service.

Each of the Rail Runner stations contains an icon to express each community's identity. The icon representing this station is a conquistador helmet, representing the expedition of Francisco Vásquez de Coronado, who passed through what is now Bernalillo.

References

External links
Stations, Downtown Bernalillo Official Rail Runner site

Railway stations in New Mexico
Railway stations in the United States opened in 2007
Buildings and structures in Sandoval County, New Mexico
Transportation in Sandoval County, New Mexico
2007 establishments in New Mexico